Guyanese culture reflects the influence of  African, Indian, Amerindian, British, Portuguese, Chinese, Creole, and Dutch cultures. Guyana is part of the mainland Caribbean region. Guyanese culture shares a continuum with the cultures of islands in the West Indies.

Holidays

Celebrations in Guyana reflect the diverse origins of its people; typical European holidays such as Easter and Christmas, Diwali, and Holi(Phagwah) from Guyanese Hindus, and Mashramani, a holiday to celebrate Guyana's independence inspired by Amerindian festivals.

Literature and theatre

Colonial society put a greater value on entertainment from Europe than locally-produced ones, and for the most part sought to emulate popular Victorian English styles. Abolition of slavery and the end of indenture were factors in a growing middle class, and towards the middle of the 20th century, there was a growing need for arts that reflected the reality of life and people of the Caribbean region. 

Notable Guyanese authors include Wilson Harris, Jan Carew, Denis Williams, Roy A. K. Heath and E. R. Braithwaite. Braithwaite's memoir To Sir, With Love details his experiences as a black high-school teacher in the poor East End of London. An early Guyanese-born author was Edgar Mittelholzer, who became more well known while living in Trinidad and England. He is well known for his works, which include Corentyne Thunder and a three-novel set known as the Kaywana Trilogy, the latter focusing on one family through 350 years of Guyana's history. Other writers who have made a significant contribution to Guyanese literary culture include Fred D'Aguiar, David Dabydeen, Martin Carter and Shana Yardan.

Although the beginning of theatre in 19th-century Georgetown was European, in the early 20th century a new African and Indian Guyanese middle-class theatre emerged. In the 1950s there was an explosion of an ethnically diverse and socially committed theatre. Despite an economic depression, there was a struggle to maintain theatre post-1980. Serious repertory theatre was highlighted by Carifesta and the Theatre Guild of Guyana. Wordsworth McAndrew has been prominent in Guyanese theatre since the 1960s.

Guyanese actors who have been successful internationally include Harry Baird, Norman Beaton, Anthony Chinn, Tommy Eytle, Cy Grant, Ram John Holder, Pauline Melville, Carmen Munroe, Sol Raye, and Ian Valz.

Music and visual arts

Guyana's musical tradition is a mix of African, Indian, European, and Latin elements. The most popular type of music is Calypso and its offshoots and mixes, like in other parts of the Eastern Caribbean. The various types of popular music include reggae, calypso, chutney, Soca, local Guyanese soca-chutney and Bollywood film songs (or Indian music). Due to globalization, sounds from neighbouring countries can be heard such as Merengue, Bachata, Salsa, with Reggaeton being the most popular. Popular Guyanese performers include Billy (William) Moore, Terry Gajraj, Mark Holder, Eddy Grant, Dave Martins & the Tradewinds, Aubrey Cummings and Nicky Porter. Among the most successful Guyanese record producers are Eddy Grant, Terry Gajraj and Dave Martin.

Visual art takes many forms in Guyana, but its dominant themes are Amerindian, the ethnic diversity of the population and the natural environment. Modern and contemporary visual artists living in, or originally from, Guyana include Stanley Greaves, Ronald Savory, Philip Moore, Donald Locke, Frank Bowling, Hew Locke, Roshini Kempadoo, Leila Locke, George Simon and Aubrey Williams.

Film
The story of cinema in Guyana goes back to the 1920s when the Gaiety, probably British Guiana's first cinema, stood by the Brickdam Roman Catholic Presbytery in Georgetown, and showed Charlie Chaplin-type silent movies. After the Gaiety burnt down around 1926, other cinemas followed, such as the Metro on Middle Street in Georgetown, which became the Empire; the London on Camp Street, which became the Plaza; and the Astor on Church and Waterloo Streets, which opened around 1940.

The Capitol on La Penitence Street in Albouystown had a rough reputation. The Metropole was on Robb and Wellington Streets; the Rialto, which became the Rio, on Vlissengen Road; the Hollywood was in Kitty; and the Strand De Luxe on Wellington Street, was considered the luxury showplace.

Cinema seating was distinctly divided. Closest to the screen, with rows of hard wooden benches, was the lowly Pit, where the effort of looking upwards at the screen for several hours gave one a permanent stiff neck. The next section, House, was separated from the Pit by a low partition wall. House usually had individual but connected wooden rows of seats that flipped up or down. Above House was the Box section, with soft, private seats and, behind Box, Balcony, a favourite place for dating couples. These divisions in the cinema roughly represented the different strata existing in colonial society.

Architecture
Guyana's historic architecture reflects the country's British colonial past. Even current houses when made of wood still emulate aspects of the style. Many of the buildings in Georgetown and New Amsterdam were built entirely of local wood.

Sports

The most-played sports in Guyana are cricket, basketball and football. Key sport organizations in Guyana include the government's Ministry of Culture, Youth and Sport; the Guyana Cricket Board; Guyana Amateur Basketball Federation; and the Guyana Football Federation. Professional level sports have suffered from lack of funding, lacking access to facilities and training. Guyana plays as part of West Indies team for international cricket since 1928. 

Guyana's national football teams, the Golden Jaguars and the Lady Jaguars, participate at the international level. A number of boxers have done well at the international level, including Andrew Lewis, Vivian Harris, Wayne Braithwaite. Boxing is the only sport that has earned Guyana an Olympic medal.

Cricket 
Cricket has been an important vehicle for cultural unity across the Caribbean. In British Guiana, it represented a way for the non-white lower classes to earn recognition in colonial society. It was introduced to Guyana by British military teams, and has since become dominated by Afro and Indo-Guyanese. The West Indies team victory in 1950 against England at Lord's, "still remains the single most satisfying moment in the history of West Indies cricket" also inspired a calypso.

Guyana hosted international cricket matches as part of the 2007 Cricket World Cup. The new 15,000-seat Providence Stadium, also referred to as Guyana National Stadium, was built in time for the World Cup and was ready for the beginning of play on March 28. At the first international game of CWC 2007 at the stadium, Lasith Malinga of the Sri Lankan team performed a "helmet trick" or "double hat-trick" (four wickets in four consecutive deliveries).

Cuisine

Guyanese cuisine is similar to the rest of the Anglo Caribbean, especially Trinidad, where the ethnic mix is somewhat similar. The food reflects the ethnic makeup of the country and its colonial history, and includes Ethnic groups of African, Creole, East Indian, Portuguese, Amerindian, Chinese and European (mostly British) influences and dishes. The food is diverse and includes dishes such as dal bhat, curry, roti and cookup rice (the local variation on the Anglo-Caribbean rice and peas). The one-pot meal, while not the national dish, is one of the most cooked dishes. 

Dishes have been adapted to Guyanese tastes, often by the addition of herbs and spices. Unique preparations include Guyana Pepperpot, a stew of Amerindian origin made with meat, cassareep (a bitter extract of the cassava), and seasonings. Other favourites are cassava bread, stews, and metemgee, a thick rich type of soup with ground provision, coconut milk and large dumplings (called Duff), eaten with fried fish or chicken. Homemade bread-making, an art in many villages, is a reflection of the British influence that includes pastries such as cheese rolls, pine tarts (pineapple tarts), and patties.

Many common dishes have their ultimate ancient origins in eastern Uttar Pradesh. These include satwa, pholourie, parsad,  pera, dal puri, and several other variations of Indian dishes.  Curry is widely popular in Guyana and most types of meat can be curried: chicken, seafood, goat, lamb, and even duck. 

Caribbean ground provisions (known colloquially as provisions) are part of the staple diet and include cassava, sweet potato, and eddoes. There is an abundance of fresh fruits, vegetables and seafood on the coast.

Most individuals use fresh fruits to make their own beverages, which are called "local drink", which are made from readily available fruits or other parts of plants. Popular homemade drinks are Lime Wash (like lemonade), pine drink (from a pineapple), mauby, made from the bark of a tree; sorrel drink, made from hibiscus; ginger beer (made from ginger root), and peanut punch.

Fresh fish and seafood are an integral part of the Guyanese diet especially in the rural areas and small villages along the coast. Popular fish types include gilbaka, butter fish, tilapia, catfish, and hassa (Hoplosternum). The crab soups with okra from the Berbice coastal region resemble the Louisiana Creole soups like gumbo.

Christmas and Old Year's Night (New Year) is the most celebrated time for Guyanese for food and festivities. Advance preparation is part of the exciting pre-preparation for Christmas celebrations. It starts with the preparation and soaking of fruits and rum or wine for Black Cake weeks or sometimes months ahead to intensify the flavour. Local drinks such as ginger beer, mauby and sorrel are fermented and require a sitting (pre-preparation) period prior to making. Ginger beer is the Christmas drink of choice, similar to the popularity of eggnog in North America. Some dishes certain to be served are Guyana pepperpot, garlic pork, black cake, sponge cake and home-made bread. Some of the local drinks and food require advance preparation.

Guyanese style Chinese food having its ultimate origins in several coastal southern Chinese provinces are popular along with fried chicken as the most popular restaurant and take-out items in the bigger towns.  Popular Chinese dishes include lo mein, chow mein, and "Chicken in the ruff" (fried rice with Chinese-style fried chicken).

Folklore
Guyanese folklore is similar to Caribbean folklore, mixed with African, Indian, Amerindian, and British/European beliefs.
Folklores are the cultural beliefs and demonstrations that bind people from a group and help them to form an identity. These expressions can be in the form of dances, food, festivals, proverbs, stories, legends, music, festivals and costumes. Guyanese myths have their foundations in cultural influences from Amerindian, European, African and Indian backgrounds. Some of these beliefs are similar to the Caribbean diaspora while some are uniquely Guyanese. Some known Guyanese myths include:

The Old Higue (Hag)

An Old Higue is an old woman, who can also be depicted as a man, that becomes a ball of fire at night and flies through the air seeking babies' blood. After shedding her skin, she places it in a calabash gourd or in a tree for safekeeping and then proceeds to travel until she finds a newborn baby. She draws blood from the infant who then becomes blue and dies. The belief of this being is still upheld in many rural areas and people usually set traps to catch the old higue after which they would beat her with a manicole broom. The manicole broom is left over the doorway along with a bowl of uncooked rice which she cannot resist counting. When the old higue begins to count the rice grain she has to be careful not to drop it, or she would have to restart her undertaking which may keep her into the morning hours and get her caught by the family. People also believe that if the old higue's skin is found, it should be pounded with salt and pepper and left where found. Once the old higue puts back the on their body it will burn them to death. 

Obeah
Obeah is a practice stemming from African origins passed down from the times of slavery. This is a practice where people petition to dead ancestors for assistance with issues like health, family, work, love or seeking favour and protection. An offering and commitment have to be made after which the instructions given should be followed precisely. 

Cumfa

This is an African-style dance which includes the beating of drums. The drums are an instrument used to summons spirit into a human host's body. The dancers perform ceremonial, acrobatic and energetic dances sometimes over broken bottles and whilst eating fire in tribute to spirits and ancestors. The dancers are unscathed and do not have recollection of the performance once the spirit leaves the body. 

   Dmitri Allicock. (2012). Myths, Legends, Folktales and Fables of Guyana. Retrieved from:
https://guyaneseonline.files.wordpress.com/2012/10/myths-legends-folktales-and-fables-of-guyana.pdf

Language

English is the main language, and Guyana is the only English-speaking country in South America, though many people in neighboring Suriname also speak English. British English is taught in school and used in Government and business. Guyanese creole, a pidgin of 17th-century English, African and Hindi words, is used at home and on the street. It is the same as creoles spoken in the Eastern Caribbean such Barbados, Trinidad and Tobago, and St. Vincent but with different accent or emphasis on how the words are pronounced.

There are also a small number of trace words from the extinct Dutch Creoles, and French. Depending on the race of the person and location, the accent and sprinkling of other words can also change. An example of this would be an Indo Guyanese who would use a word or two words left over from when they spoke Hindi.

As time passes, British terms and phrases for things are being replaced by American ones, due to US influence. Where once people would have said "flats" as in England, the term "apartment" is now being used by some people.

Religion

There are 3 major religions in Guyana; Christianity, Islam, and Hinduism.

References

Reference bibliography
 Ali, Arif (ed). Guyana. London: Hansib, 2008

 
 Smock, Kirk. Guyana: the Bradt Travel Guide. 2007.